Mashrafe is a 2016 Bengali biography book written by Debbrata Mukherjee. The book follows Bangladeshi cricketer Mashrafe Mortaza, from his early life to his cricket career.

Synopsis 
The book summarises Mashrafe Mortaza's early life, and his career at Bangladesh national cricket team.

Background 
In an interview, Debbrata Mukherjee said "It was really tough. It was tough to write about such a person neutrally with whom I have been roaming in the Khulna town for 12 years". Mashrafe is a first publication of the Bangladesh Cricket Supporters Association.

Reception 
Mohammad Isam of ESPNcricinfo wrote, "The book is richer for the access Mukherjee, who wrote an interview-based book about Shakib Al Hasan last year, got from his subject. It has helped him draw an accurate picture of the life of one of Bangladesh's most iconic players". Mashrafe Mortaza, said "It is really inspiring to have a book written about me at the fag end of my career".

References

External links
Mashrafe biography on Goodreads   

2016 non-fiction books
Bangladeshi books
Sports biographies
Cricket books
Mashrafe Mortaza